is a sub-kilometer asteroid from the inner asteroid belt, that has a similar but different orbit than main-belt comet P/2010 A2. During January 2010, it had been observed for two weeks by the Mount Lemmon Survey, but has since become a lost asteroid.  the object has not been recovered.

Description 
Using the best-fit short-arc orbital data, it appears as if the closest that comet  came to asteroid  is around 0.0155 AU on 22 November 2009.

This asteroid was discovered on 7 January 2010. Since it has only been observed over a fifteen-day arc of its 3.5 year orbit, details of the exact orbit still need further refining for easy recovery of this object in the distant future. The asteroid appears to have come to perihelion (closest approach to the Sun) on around 10 January 2010, only a couple days after its discovery.

See also
Asteroid impact prediction
List of asteroid close approaches to Earth
List of Earth-crossing minor planets

References

External links 
 

Minor planet object articles (unnumbered)
20100107